Haby Niaré (born 26 June 1993 in Mantes-la-Jolie) is a French taekwondo practitioner. Niaré won the gold medal in the women's welterweight (under 67 kg) division at the 2013 World Taekwondo Championships in Puebla.

References

External links
 

1993 births
Living people
French female taekwondo practitioners
People from Mantes-la-Jolie
Taekwondo practitioners at the 2015 European Games
European Games competitors for France
Taekwondo practitioners at the 2016 Summer Olympics
Olympic silver medalists for France
Mediterranean Games bronze medalists for France
Competitors at the 2013 Mediterranean Games
Sportspeople from Yvelines
Mediterranean Games medalists in taekwondo
European Taekwondo Championships medalists
World Taekwondo Championships medalists
21st-century French women